Rusk High School is a public high school located in Rusk, Texas (USA). It is the sole high school in the Rusk Independent School District. In 2015, the school was rated "Met Standard" by the Texas Education Agency.

Athletics
The Rusk Eagles compete in the following sports:

Football
Golf
Powerlifting
Softball
Swimming
Tennis
Track and field
Volleyball

References

External links 
 Official website

Public high schools in Texas
Schools in Cherokee County, Texas